Sérgio Meira de Santa Cruz Oliveira (born December 31, 1968) is a Brazilian linguist who specializes in the Cariban and Tupian language families of lowland South America and in the Tiriyó language in particular. He has worked on the classification of the Cariban language family, and has collected primary linguistic data from speakers of 14 Cariban languages and 5 non-Cariban languages.

Education and personal life
Meira holds a BA and a PhD in Linguistics Theory and Analysis from Rice University. His doctoral research was in collaboration with his supervisor Spike Gildea. Sérgio Meira is a member of the American Anthropological Association (AAA) and of the Society for the Study of the Indigenous Languages of the Americas (SSILA).

In addition to his native Portuguese, Sérgio Meira is proficient in English, French, and Spanish, is moderately fluent in Esperanto, Italian, German, Dutch, Volapük, Romanian, and has a good command of Catalan, Russian, Latin, and other languages.

Career
He is currently a researcher at the Radboud University Nijmegen. His research focuses on historical linguistics, fieldwork and description of the Cariban and Tupian language families, as well as language and cognition.

His work helped in the development of the South American Phonological Inventory Database (SAPhon), the World Atlas of Language Structures (WALS), and Glottolog.

Volapük
Sérgio Meira is one of eight academicians at the International Volapük Academy. He was appointed in 2007 by Brian Reynold Bishop, the seventh cifal and the academy's president at that time. He is also an active member of the Volapük discussion group, which unites most living volapükologists.

Meira translated articles, including Rasmus Malling-Hansen's obituary, from Volapük into English for the International Rasmus Malling-Hansen Society. He also did translation work on the Volapük Wikisource, but later suggested that his work be deleted because it would be considered copyright infringement. Sérgio Meira is one of Andrew Drummond's correspondents who contributed to his knowledge of Volapük material prior to the writing of A Hand-Book of Volapük.

In late October 2006, Sérgio Meira started contributing to the Volapük Wikipedia. He is the main author of most of the featured articles.

Selected publications
Meira has a number of publications; an overview of some highlights is given below:

Cariban family
 On the Origin of Ablaut in the Cariban Family (2010)
 'Natural concepts' in the spatial topological domain—adpositional meanings in cross-linguistic perspective: an exercise in semantic typology (2003)
 The Southern Cariban languages and the Cariban family (2005)
 Sobre an origem histórica dos 'prefixos relacionais' das línguas tupí-guaraní (2013)

Tiriyó
Rhythmic stress in Tiriyó (Cariban)

Notes

References

1968 births
Living people
Linguists from Brazil
Rice University alumni
Volapükologists
Brazilian Esperantists